Robert Michael Hensel (b. May 8, 1969) was born with the birth defect known as Spina bifida. He is also a Guinness World Records holder for the longest non-stop wheelie in a wheelchair, covering a total distance of 6.178 miles. As part of setting his record, he raised money for wheelchair ramps throughout Oswego, New York, his hometown.

In 2000, realizing the need to focus more on one's abilities and less on their disabilities, Hensel sought to have a week designated that would bring to light the many talents and accomplishments being made by individuals with disabilities. Due to his efforts, Oswego County passed a motion that year recognizing Oct. 1-7 as Beyond Limitations week.

Awards and honors
State of New York Executive Chamber Certificate of Commendation
Guinness World Record Holder
Spokesperson for Athletes for Hope
2008 Go Fast Sports & Beverage Athlete

References

External links
 
 
 Hensel's active account at Facebook for nonprofit support to those with disabilities
 Famous Oswegonians
 'Believe And Achieve' Set Tonight At Armory from Oswego County Today

1969 births
Living people
People with spina bifida
American disability rights activists
People from Oswego, New York